Trevor Bailey (born 28 September 1961) is an Australian former professional rugby league footballer who played in the 1980s. He played in the Brisbane Rugby League Premiership for the Brothers club and in the New South Wales Rugby League Premiership for the St. George Dragons.

Career

He went on to play three seasons with the St. George Dragons between 1988-90 under the coaching of Ted Glossop and Craig Young. Bailey was a member of the first grade team during those seasons and was hooker in the victorious St. George Dragons team that won the 1988 Panasonic Cup.

References

1961 births
Living people
Australian rugby league coaches
Australian rugby league players
Past Brothers players
Rugby league hookers
Rugby league players from Brisbane
St. George Dragons players
Wakefield Trinity coaches